Stephen Bradley (born 19 November 1984) is a retired Irish footballer, he has been the manager of Shamrock Rovers F.C. since July 2016. Besides the Republic of Ireland, he has played in England and Scotland.

Playing career
Bradley represented Republic of Ireland national football team at U14, U15, U16 and U21 levels. In October 2000, Bradley played for the Republic of Ireland national football team U16s in a qualifying tournament in Riga for the 2001 UEFA European Under-16 Football Championship where he came up against Andrés Iniesta. He played schoolboy football with Lourdes Celtic before joining Arsenal where he became captain of the club's reserve side, without ever breaking into the senior side. After a loan spell at Dunfermline Athletic, where he made 5 appearances, he returned to Ireland and signed for Drogheda United in March 2005.

In his first season at United Park Stephen picked up an FAI Cup winners medal as Drogheda beat Cork City 2–0 in the final at Lansdowne Road. He was also part of the side that won the league title in 2007 but he left Drogheda at the end of that season having made 29 league appearances and scoring seven goals.

In January 2008 Bradley signed for Scottish club, Falkirk , and made 4 appearances for the 'Bairns' before being let go in July 2008.

In January 2009 Bradley signed for Michael O'Neill at Shamrock Rovers  and made his debut on the opening day of the 2009 League of Ireland season in a 0–0 draw away to Bray Wanderers . He made 30 league appearances in his first season with the Hoops and made 16 more in Rovers' title winning season of 2010. He made 3 appearances in the 2010–11 UEFA Europa League  .

At the end of the 2010 League of Ireland season Bradley was released by the Hoops and moved across the M50 to join Pete Mahon at St Patrick's Athletic. In 30 league appearances during 2011 he scored three times from the penalty spot and also played a key role in the club's run to the third qualifying round of the Europa league.

Managerial career

Shamrock Rovers 
In 2016, Bradley became caretaker manager of Shamrock Rovers and was named as the new head-coach in November 2016.

In 2019, Bradley guided Shamrock Rovers to finish in second place in the League of Ireland Premier Division, finishing 11 points behind first-place Dundalk FC. In the 2019 FAI Cup, they saw better success, reaching the final against Dundalk and winning 4-2  on penalties to claim their first national silverware in eight years, and their first FAI Cup win since 1987.
In 2020, Shamrock Rovers won their 18th league title under Bradley, winning the title with 4 games to spare. In 2021 Bradley's Rovers team retained the title, winning the league by sixteen points.

Managerial statistics

Honours

Playing
Drogheda United
 League of Ireland (1): 2007
 FAI Cup (1): 2005
 Setanta Sports Cup (2): 2006, 2007

Shamrock Rovers
 League of Ireland (1): 2010

St Patrick's Athletic
 Leinster Senior Cup (1): 2010–11

Limerick
 League of Ireland First Division (1): 2012
 Munster Senior Cup (1): 2011–12

Madeira Cup
Republic of Ireland U21 - 2004

Individual
PFAI First Division Team of the Year (1): 2012

Management
Shamrock Rovers
League of Ireland Premier Division:
Winners: 2020, 2021, 2022
Runner Up: 2019
Winner: FAI Cup: 2019
Runner Up: 2020
Runner Up: League of Ireland Cup: 2017
Winner: President of Ireland's Cup: 2022
Runner up: 2021
Runner up: 2023

Individual
PFAI Manager of the Year: 2020, 2021, 2022

References

External links

O'Neill Makes First Signings

1984 births
Living people
Association footballers from Dublin (city)
Republic of Ireland association footballers
Republic of Ireland under-21 international footballers
Republic of Ireland youth international footballers
League of Ireland players
Arsenal F.C. players
Dunfermline Athletic F.C. players
Drogheda United F.C. players
Shamrock Rovers F.C. players
Falkirk F.C. players
Scottish Premier League players
Expatriate footballers in Scotland
St Patrick's Athletic F.C. players
Limerick F.C. players
Association football midfielders
League of Ireland managers
Shamrock Rovers F.C. managers
Irish association football managers